Samir Benghanem (born 10 December 1993) is a dutch handball player for HV Aalsmeer and the Dutch national team.

He represented the Netherlands at the 2020 European Men's Handball Championship.

References

1993 births
Living people
Dutch male handball players
Sportspeople from The Hague